The Sinfonietta in A major is a composition for orchestra by Sergei Prokofiev.

Background
Sergei Prokofiev wrote his Sinfonietta in A major, Op. 5, in 1909 and dedicated it to Nikolai Tcherepnin, his conducting professor at the St. Petersburg Conservatory.

Prokofiev subsequently modified it twice, once in 1914 and finally in 1929, publishing the final revision as Op. 5/48.  The premiere of the final revision was under Konstantin Saradzhev on 18 November 1930.

Analysis
The Sinfonietta is rather similar to the better-known Classical Symphony, being light in character, while infusing Prokofiev's typical twists of harmony. However, it is rarely performed.

Movements
The piece is in 5 movements, lasting around 25 minutes.
Allegro giocoso
Andante
Intermezzo: Vivace
Scherzo: Allegro risoluto
Allegro giocoso

Instrumentation
The music is scored for 2 flutes, 2 oboes, 2 clarinets, 2 bassoons, 4 horns, 2 trumpets and strings.

Recordings

References

Compositions by Sergei Prokofiev
Prokofiev
1909 compositions
1914 compositions
1929 compositions
Compositions in A major